The Aprilia RS-GP is the name of the series of four-stroke V4 Prototype Motorcycles developed by Aprilia to compete in the MotoGP World Championship, starting from 2015 season.

History

For 2015, Aprilia returned to the world championship supplying Aprilia Racing Team Gresini with two bikes for riders Álvaro Bautista and Marco Melandri, who made a comeback since he last competed in the premier class back in 2010.

For 2016, Aprilia stayed in MotoGP but this time the 2011 Moto2 World Champion, Stefan Bradl, joined the Aprilia squad, having competed with the team from 2015 Indianapolis motorcycle Grand Prix onward.

On March 26, 2017, the RS-GP achieved its best result yet, having finished in 6th place in the 2017 Qatar motorcycle Grand Prix with Aleix Espargaró after starting the race from 15 on the grid, the same feat occurred in 2018 at Aragon when Aleix Espargaró achieved another P6 result.

During the 2021 season, the RS-GP saw major improvements and results primarily by Aleix Espargaró as opposed to the results in 2018 through to 2020. The RS-GP once again achieved 2 more P6 finishes in Portimão and Jerez by Aleix Espargaró once again and saw consistent top 10 finishes by Espargaró while former test rider Lorenzo Savadori who was promoted after Bradley Smith left, only saw his personal best results within the top 15 with 2 15th-place finishes and a 14th-place finish. The RS-GP also achieved its best Qualifying result within the top 3 in the MotoGP era with Aleix Espargaró starting 3rd behind Fabio Quartararo in 2nd and Johan Zarco in 1st.

At the British GP, Aleix Espargaró earned both Aprilia and the RS-GP its first-ever podium finish in 3rd in the Modern MotoGP 4-stroke era and Aprilia's first podium finish in the premier class since Jeremy McWilliams in 2000.

In 2022, another bout of improvements to the RS-GP saw it qualify on pole position and for the Argentine GP. Rider Aleix Espargaró then went on to win the race. This was not only the first win for Aprilia in MotoGP, but the first win for Espargaró in 200 starts.

Specifications

Complete MotoGP results
(key) (results in bold indicate pole position; results in italics indicate fastest lap)

See also 
 KTM RC16
 Honda RC213V
 Suzuki GSX-RR
 Yamaha YZR-M1
 Ducati Desmosedici

References

RS-GP
Grand Prix motorcycles
Motorcycles introduced in 2015